The pilot fish (Naucrates ductor) is a carnivorous fish of the trevally, or jackfish family, Carangidae. It is widely distributed and lives in warm or tropical open seas.

Description

The pilot fish congregates around sharks, rays, and sea turtles, where it eats ectoparasites on, and leftovers around the host species; younger pilot fish are usually associated with jellyfish and drifting seaweeds. They are also known to follow ships, sometimes for long distances; one was found in County Cork, Ireland, and many pilot fish have been sighted on the shores of England. Their fondness for ships led the ancients to believe that they would navigate a ship to its desired course.

The pilot fish's color is between dark blue and blackish-silver, with the belly being lighter in color. The pilot fish is also known to have a temporary variation of color when excited; its dark-colored bars disappear, and its body turns silvery-white, with three broad blue patches on its back. It can be recognized by its five to seven distinctive traverse bands, which are of a much darker color than the rest of the body. The pilot fish can grow up to 60–70 cm in length.

The pilot fish is edible and is said to taste good, but it is rarely available due to its erratic behavior when caught.

While pilot fish can be seen with all manner of sharks, they prefer accompanying the oceanic whitetip, Carcharhinus longimanus. The pilot fish's relationship with sharks is a mutualist one; the pilot fish gains protection from predators, while the shark gains freedom from parasites. It was often said by sailors that sharks and pilot fish share something like a "close companionship"; there were even tales of this fish following ships which had captured "their" shark for up to six weeks and showing signs of distress in its absence.

Whatever the veracity of such reports, it is extremely rare that a shark will feed on a pilot fish, and smaller pilot fish are frequently observed swimming into sharks' mouths to clean away fragments of food from between their teeth. As Herman Melville put it,

These observations have led to the pilot fish's distinctive markings being copied for decals supplied as shark protection for surfboards.

Etymology and metaphors 

There  are a few possible, conflicting etymologies for the term "pilot fish". One is that seafaring people believed that pilot fish, which would appear around the bow of their ships when they were close to land, were leading (or piloting) them back to port. An alternative etymology is that pilot fish were once, erroneously, thought to be piloting sharks to food, or even (as legends have it) piloting ships, whales and swimmers to safety.

In Greek mythology a sailor called Pompilus helped the nymph Ocyrhoe when she was fleeing away from the god Apollo. The sailor moved the nymph from Miletus to Samos and the god punished him by making him a pilot fish.

The pilot fish is sometimes used as a metaphor or simile; "they are like the pilot fish to the shark, serving to lead him to his victim". Pilot fish are also used as a metaphor or simile for scavengers or looters which accompany a greater threat.

In popular culture 

In the BBC science fiction series Doctor Who, the pilot fish were used in analogical terms for a robotic species who congregated around more dangerous life-forms, such as the Sycorax and the Racnoss. They appeared three times in the series; twice with David Tennant in "The Christmas Invasion" (2005) and "The Runaway Bride" (2006), and once with Matt Smith in "The Pandorica Opens" (2010).
    
In the Discworld novel Making Money, during a conspiracy to entrap Moist von Lipwig, Heretofore reflects on his current predicament and uncomfortable relationship with Cosmo Lavish and says "Does he think he's Vetinari? What do they call those fishes that swim alongside sharks, making themselves useful so they don't get eaten? That's me, that's what I'm doing, just hanging on, because it's much safer than letting go."

Ernest Hemingway bitterly immortalised John Dos Passos as a "pilot fish" for the wealthy in A Moveable Feast, after falling out with him over the Spanish Civil War.

References

External links 

Naucrates ductor at FishBase
 

Naucratinae
Pantropical fish
Fish described in 1758
Taxa named by Carl Linnaeus